Kabasakal is a village in Adana Province, Turkey. It is a part of Çukurova district which itself is a part of Greater Adana. It is at the northwest of  the city, the distance between the village and the city center being only  and it has almost merged with the city. The population of the village  is 1315.

References

Villages in Adana Province
Çukurova, Adana